Meenakshi Dixit is an Indian actress who has worked in Telugu, Tamil, Hindi, Malayalam and Kannada films.

Background
Meenakshi Dixit was born in Raebareli, Uttar Pradesh. She is the daughter of Ishwar Chandra Dixit, a senior lawyer in Civil Court in Raebareli, and Geeta Dixit. She graduated with a degree in Bachelor of Science in Botany, Zoology, and Chemistry. She has trained in Kathak and western dance.

Career
In 2008 Meenakshi Dixit appeared as a contestant in NDTV Imagine's dance reality show Nachle Ve with Saroj Khan hosted by Saroj Khan, which led to her entry into the Indian film industry. She first appeared in a Telugu film, Lifestyle. Later on, she got into modelling, endorsing local and international brands such as Joyalukkas Jewelry, Microsoft Windows, Fair and Handsome cream, Chennai Silks, Shankaram diamond jewellery, Brook Bond Taza tea, Paaneri Sarees, Lee Cooper, Red Square Energy Drink, Radio Mirchi, ESSAR, Anytime Fitness gym and Aquagaurd. She has also been a regular model for the fashion industry, as well as in prominent Indian magazines.

In 2011, she made a special appearance in a dance number in Dookudu, the year's highest grossing Telugu film. Following Dookudu, she was also chosen by the producers of the Bodyguard remake to do a dance number, hoping that it would repeat the success of her number in Dookudu. She also performed an item number in the Tamil film Billa II, considered to be one of her biggest project to be done yet. 2014 she was seen in lead roles in two films. She played the role of a princess in the Tamil period-comedy Tenaliraman while the thriller-drama Adavi Kachina Vennela saw her playing an aspiring sharp shooter, with the actress also performing stunts in the film.

She was introduced in Bollywood by National Award Winner director Kundan shah's  P Se PM Tak in 2015. She played a feisty prostitute who finds herself in the Chief Minister's chair and then in the run to become the Prime Minister of the country. Filmmaker Kundan Shah said "She is photogenic and also a talented actress". She was next seen in Laal Rang in 2016 as Randeep Hooda's onscreen love interest where she plays the role of a medical student.

Her last Tamil film was Bayam Oru Payanam. She next played the role of Nidhi in the 2019 Telugu film Maharshi.

Filmography

Film

Television

Music videos

Awards

References

External links

 

Living people
Actresses in Malayalam cinema
Actresses in Tamil cinema
Actresses in Telugu cinema
Indian film actresses
21st-century Indian actresses
People from Raebareli
Actresses from Uttar Pradesh
Actresses in Hindi television
Indian television actresses
Actresses in Hindi cinema
Year of birth missing (living people)